David A. Nethercot OBE, FREng, FIStructE, FICE, FCGI is a British structural engineer.

He was the Head of the Civil Engineering Department at Imperial College London until September 2011. He was president of the Institution of Structural Engineers (IStructE) in 2003-04 and the 2009 recipient of their Gold Medal.

In June 2012 he became President of the City & Guilds College Association, the association for engineering alumni of Imperial College. 1 November 2013 he became President of the International Association for Bridge and Structural Engineering (IABSE).

See also
 Imperial College Civil & Environmental Engineering

References

External links
 Imperial College's page
 City & Guilds College Association

Fellows of the Royal Academy of Engineering
Academics of Imperial College London
Engineering educators
Living people
Presidents of the Institution of Structural Engineers
British structural engineers
Officers of the Order of the British Empire
IStructE Gold Medal winners
Fellows of the Australian Academy of Technological Sciences and Engineering
Year of birth missing (living people)